The 1st Armored Division is a unit of the French Army formed during World War II that took part in the Liberation of France.

The unit was dissolved for the first time in 1946, and was recommissioned in 1948. It was dissolved again in 1999 as a consequence of the professionalization of the French military.

The 1st Mechanised Brigade (1re BM), created on July 1, 1999, inherited the traditions of the 1re DB. The 1re BM was again dissolved on July 21, 2015.
The 1st Division (1re DIV) was recreated in 2016.

Creation and different nomenclatures 

 The 1st Armored Division (1re DB) was created on May 1, 1943.
 It was dissolved on March 31, 1946.
 The 1st Armored Division was recreated in 1948. 
 On July 1, 1999, the 1st Mechanised Brigade (1re BM) inherited the traditions of the division.
 The 1st Mechanised Brigade was dissolved on July 21, 2015. 
 The 1st Division (1re DIV) was recreated on July 1, 2016, part of the Scorpion Force alongside the 3rd Division.

<== Motto and designation ==<

air >The Latin motto of the division, Nomine et Virtute Prima, translates literally to "La première par le nom et la valeur" in French, and "The first by name and valor" in English. The choice of the insignia, the cross of Saint Louis by général Jean Touzet du Vigier, derives from Tunisia, the place where the unit was formed, and also where
King Louis IX of France was laid to rest in 1270.

The division is known and referred to as the "Saint-Louis division".

The division was cited three times during the Second World War.

History

1943–1946 

In 1943, Free-French armed forces were formed in exile in the French colonies of Africa under the command of General De Gaulle. The units were equipped with modern equipment provided by the United States, and the program anticipated the constitution of several armed divisions. Following the arrival of equipment in North Africa from the US, only three divisions were constituted, each comprising the following units:
 One command staff
 One company of headquarter staff
 Three command staff brigade
 One reconnaissance regiment
 Three tank regiments
 One chasseur tank regiment
 Three mounted infantry battalions
 Three artillery groups
 One engineer battalion
 One group FTA
 One repair group squadron
 One transmission company
 One service company
 One medical battalion
 One exploitation group

These divisions were organised according to American customs, in three combat commands. The three French divisions were organised in this way for the duration of 1944-1945 operations.

Within this context, the 1st Armored Division (1st DB) was formed on May 1, 1943. The division was heir to the Light Mechanised Brigade which saw combat in Tunisia. On January 28, 1943, General Jean Touzet du Vigier (promoted on December 25, 1942) took command of this unit as it was being formed. He left the command of the BLM to General  and installed his command post in Mascara, Algeria, the training center for armored brigades.

Adding to these four formations were one mounted regiment, the 2nd Zouaves, of Oran, the 68th Artillery Regiment, of Tunisia; the 88th Engineer Battalion, recently created at Port-Lyautey, and the 38th FTA group, of Ténès. During May 1943, the transmission and service companies joined, and in August, the train and a squadron group reinforced them. Then the 2nd Chasseurs d'Afrique was divided (doubled) to form 2nd Tank-Cuirassiers Regiment, a regiment that Général du Vigier commanded in 1940. The latter had just been promoted to a divisional general on August 25, and all the forces under his command were grouped around Mascara.

The 2nd Zouaves Regiment disappeared and was replaced, as the infantry of the division, by three independent battalions, the 1st, 2nd and 3rd Zouaves, forming a demi-brigade. The division became part of the First Army (then designated Army B) and which participated in the amphibious assault on Provence. The initial embarkation began in Oran and Mers-el-Kébir at the end of July 1944, after several manoeuvres. The naval ships lifted anchor on August 10 and 11. The disembarkment was to take place between Saint-Tropez and Saint-Raphaël. At dawn on August 15, an enormous naval fleet was assembled north-west of Corsica heading north.

The operations of the 1st Armored Division throughout the course of World War II comprised three phases:
 From the Mediterranean to the Vosges, August 15 to November 13, 1944
 Combat in Alsace, November 14, 1944 to February 9, 1945
 February 10 to May 7, 1945

Mediterranean to the Vosges, August 15 to November 13, 1944 
Throughout the course of the first phase of operations, the CC1 was engaged in battle, then the entire division complemented by the VI Corps, fought in the sieges of Toulon and Marseille, and the liberation of Provence. The unit reached the Rhône in a series of rapid advances, then regrouped, west of the river, for fifteen days. After disembarking, the division engaged in an advance of 600 kilometers, which would bring them to the footsteps of the Vosges, following an uninterrupted series of combat engagements, which led to the liberation of Saint-Étienne, Lyon, Anse and Villefranche, Chalon-sur-Saône, Chagny, Beaune, Dijon and Langres. Next began a slow and difficult climb into the valleys of the Vosges, in mud and rain and snow.

Following this first phase of operations, the 1st DB was cited in dispatches for its combat performance.

Combat for Alsace November 14, 1944 to February 9, 1945 
In the second phase of combat, the 1st DB was the first unit to penetrate Alsace and the first to reach the Rhine River. Advancing on November 14 from the high valley of the Doubs, the 1st DB mounted an offensive on Belfort. Operating under the 1st Army Corps of General Antoine Béthouart, it manoeuvred to Héricourt along the French-Swiss border and captured Delle on November 18. The next day, the CC3 was in Alsace and, at 1800, the tank platoon of Lieutenant Loisy was able to raise its standard on the banks of the Rhine at Rosenau. He was part of the 4th squadron of the 2nd African Chasseur Regiment and met his end on November 23 when his tank was hit by an anti-tank launcher during the attack on the Lefebvre barracks at Mulhouse. On 20 November, Colonel Caldairou entered the city. Despite the success of the rendezvous of the 1st and 2nd Army Corps near Burnhaupt, Colmar remained well protected. For the next two months, the division held a defensive sector in the snow on the Dollar River, south of what would later be referred to as the Colmar Pocket. On January 20, the 1st Army relaunched an assault on the two northern and southern flanks of the pocket, in the middle of a snow storm. Following a three-week struggle, Alsace was liberated and Colmar seized on February 2. The division, which had engaged in combat since December 5 under the orders of General Aimé Sudre, following an annoying delay in two minefields, achieved a breakthrough which led to the capture of Chalampé on the morning of February 9. Accordingly, the division completed its role in the campaign of France, which started on August 15, 1944, and which ended six months later on the Rhine.

Following this second phase of operations, the 1st DB was again cited in dispatches for its combat performance.

February 10 – May 7, 1945 
At the beginning of the third phase, starting April 5, the CC2 was in Germany. The 9th Colonial Infantry Division, cleared a path through the Black Forest, to free for the 1st Army important routes. Later to the turn, the CC3 combat engaged supporting the colonials. Following a march on Kehl and Offenburg, they made their way south to take Freiburg im Breisgau on April 21. They rejoined the division on the 28th south-west of Ulm. The 1st Armored Division crossed the Rhine on April 17. General Sudre regrouped means at the exception of CC3 around Freudenstadt, and while acting with the cadre of the 1st Army Corps, his unit mounted the assault. The division accordingly made their way to the Danube by Rottweil and Horb am Neckar, crossed the river on April 21 at Müllheim and Tuttlingen, and while engaging Stockach, pushed back along the Danube through Sigmaringen to Ulm, which was taken in liaison with the American 7th United States Army arriving from the north. The 1re DB took Immenstadt on April 30 and on the same day reached the Austrian frontier to occupy Aach and Oberstdorf. With only the field of mountains in plain sight, the division opened the way for the infantry and regrouped around Biberach. First to the Rhine, first to the Danube, the division with the Cross of Saint-Louis reached objectives following a sequence of successful event combat engagement series. The division played a decisive role towards the final campaign. The CC2 in the Black Forest, the CC3 in the fields of Bade, then the entire division engaged in combat until May 7.

Following this ultimate and third phase operations, the 1e DB was cited for a third time at the orders of the armed forces.

End of the war 
Following the cessation of hostilities, the 1ere DB joined Palatinat, around Landau. The division remained there for two months. The division sent to Berlin the first detachment in charge of representing France, on July 1, composed of : a squadron of the 3rd African Chasseur Regiment, a squadron of the 9th, 2 companies of the 1st and 3rd Zouaves, and a train detachment. On September 5, the headquarter staff of the division garrisoned at Trèves. The 1re DB, with reduced effectif by the demobilization, returned to France and garrisoned, October 1945 to March 1946 in the zones of Bourges, Châtellerault, Nantes and Angoulême. The division was dissolved on March 31, 1946.

WWII Commanders 
 Major-General Jean Touzet du Vigier (1 May 1943 - 8 January 1945)
 Major-General Aimé Sudre (8 January 1945 - 1948)

Composition in 1944 
The 1re DB which disembarked in Provence in August 1944 was composed of 73% Europeans and 27% Indigènes.

Organic units:
 3rd African Chasseur Regiment : régiment de reconnaissance
 9th African Chasseur Regiment : régiment de chasseurs de chars équipé de Tank Destroyer (TD)
 38e groupe de FTA : artillerie antiaérienne
 88e bataillon du génie
 Régiment du train divisionnaire
 291e compagnie de transport
 91/84e compagnie de transmissions
 11e GERD
 15e bataillon médical
 CC1
 2nd Cuirassiers Regiment : régiment de chars
 2nd Zouaves Regiment : infanterie portée
 68th Artillery Regiment, I/68th : artillerie
 CC2
 5th African Chasseur Regiment: régiment de chars
 1st Zouaves Regiment : infanterie portée
 III/68th : artillerie
 CC3.
 2nd African Chasseur Regiment : régiment de chars
 3rd Zouaves Regiment : infanterie portée
 II/68th : artillerie

Organization of the mounted Zouaves battalions 
The infantry of the 1re DB was constituted of three mounted Zouaves battalions organized within the following:

One BZP was assigned to each of the three CC which composed the 1e Armored Division. The effectif was almost 800 men (Pied-Noirs, Metropolitan French and Maghrebis) and consisted of 3 combat companies with almost 180 to 200 men each. Each company consisted of three combat sections (platoons) of almost fifty men mounted by 5 half-tracks (armed with machine guns, mortars and cannon 57 anti-tank).

Different and various circumstances governed combats of St-Loup-de-la-Salle, on September 6, 1944, almost 30 kilometers east of Tailly. The entire BZP endured the heavy attack. In other circumstances, road combats were also expected, which led the Zouave to often progress through mounting tanks. Nevertheless, Zouaves also often mounted assaults by themselves. Such various governing circumstances were taking place on September 9 in front of Nuits-St-Georges. A company of the 3rd BZP was ordered to apprehend Nuits-Saint-Georges. Tanks were occupied in Beaune and could not provide fire support. The resistance was strong and companies without rear support endured heavy losses. As tanks were made available again, assaults were relaunched. These were, briefly evoked, the types of various circumstances in which the BZPs conducted battle. Losses were heavy. The infantry accompanying the 1e DB endured killed in action and wounded, 1700 men out of 2400, the initial effectif. Almost 72% of the effective. Losses were compensated by reinforcements sent from North Africa as well as numerous volunteers who engaged as villages and cities were being liberated.

1948 to 1999 
The 1st Armoured Division was recreated in 1948.

In 1951, the general headquarter staff garrisoned at Trèves in Germany. The division was part of the French Forces in Germany.

Composition in 1985:

 1er Régiment de cuirassiers de St Wendel 
 6e Régiment de dragons de Saarburg
 8e Groupe de chasseurs de Wittlich
 16e Groupe de chasseurs de Saarburg
 153e Régiment d'infanterie de Mutzig 
 9e Régiment d'artillerie de marine de Trèves 
 61e Régiment d'artillerie de Morhange
 13e Régiment de génie de Trèves 
 1er Escadron d'éclairage divisionnaire de St Wendel 
 1er Régiment de commandement et de soutien de Trèves

From 1993 to 1999, the 1re Division Blindée was part of the Eurocorps.

1999–2015 
On July 1, 1999, the 1st Armored Division became the 1st Mechanised Brigade. The general headquarter staff garrisoned at Châlons-en-Champagne. The 1st Mechanised Brigade was dissolved on July 21, 2015.

Since 2016
After the 1999 reorganisation, EMF 1 was created on l July 1999 at quartier Ruty in Besançon, as a NATO type division headquarters that could supervise 20–30,000 personnel. EMF 1 was dissolved in 2016 and the 1st Division recreated from it.

The 1st Division was recreated on July 1, 2016. The division, a combined arms formation, comprises three brigades as well as French units of the Franco-German Brigade and is part of the Scorpion Force alongside the 3rd Division.

Composition 

The 1st Division is based in Besançon and is subordinated to the Commandement des Forces Terrestres (CFT). The division is made up of 25,000 personnel. 

 1 Régiment d'Artillerie (1 RA) - 1st Artillery Regiment (M270 MLRS), in Bourogne
 19 Régiment du Génie (19 RG) - 19th Engineer Regiment, in Besançon (one company in Mourmelon-le-Grand, one company in Canjuers)
 132 Régiment d'Infanterie Cynotechnique (132 RIC) - 132nd Military Working Dog Infantry Regiment, in Suippes

 7 Brigade Blindée (7 BB) – 7th Armored Brigade, in Besançon
 7 Compagnie de Commandement et de Transmissions (7 CCT) - 7th Command and Signals Company (VAB), in Besançon
 1 Régiment de Chasseurs (1 RCh) - 1st Chasseurs Regiment (Leclerc MBTs, VBL vehicles), in Verdun
 5 Régiment de Dragons (5e RD) - 5th Dragoon Regiment (Leclerc MBTs, VBCI IFVs, VAB Génie, VBL vehicles), in Mailly-le-Camp
 1 Régiment de Tirailleurs (1 RTir) - 1st Tirailleur Regiment (VBCI IFVs), in Epinal
 35 Régiment d'Infanterie (35 RI) - 35th Infantry Regiment (VBCI IFVs), in Belfort 
 152 Régiment d'Infanterie (152 RI) - 152nd Infantry Regiment (VBCI IFVs) in Colmar
 68 Régiment d'Artillerie d'Afrique (68 RAA) - 68th African Artillery Regiment (CAESAR howitzers, RTF1 mortars, Mistral missiles), in Valbonne
 3 Régiment du Génie (3 RG) - 3rd Engineer Regiment (VAB Génie), in Charleville-Mézières
 Centre de Formation Initiale des Militaires du rang 7e Brigade Blindée / 3e Régiment de Chasseurs d'Afrique (CFIM 7e BB - 3e RCA) - 7th Armored Brigade Troops Initial Formation Centre / 3rd African Chasseurs Regiment, in Valdahon

 9 Brigade d'Infanterie de Marine (9e BIMa) - 9th Marine Infantry Brigade, in Poitiers
 9 Compagnie de Commandement et de Transmissions de Marine (9 CCTMa) - 9th Marine Command and Signals Company (VAB), in Poitiers
 Régiment d'Infanterie-Chars de Marine (RICM) - Marine Infantry Tank Régiment (AMX-10 RC, VAB, VBL vehicles), in Poitiers
 1 Régiment d'Infanterie de Marine (1 RIMa) - 1st Marine Infantry Regiment (AMX-10 RC, VAB, VBL vehicles), in Angoulême
 2 Régiment d'Infanterie de Marine (2 RIMa) - 2nd Marine Infantry Regiment (VBCI IFVs), in Champagné
 3 Régiment d'Infanterie de Marine (3 RIMa) - 3rd Marine Infantry Regiment (VAB vehicles, to be replaced by VBMR Griffon), in Vannes
 126 Régiment d'Infanterie (126 RI) - 126th Infantry Regiment (VAB vehicles, being replaced by VBMR Griffon), in Brive-la-Gaillarde 
 11 Régiment d'Artillerie de Marine (11 RAMa) - 11th Marine Artillery Regiment (CAESAR and TRF1 howitzers, RTF1 mortars, Mistral missiles), in Saint-Aubin-du-Cormier
 6 Régiment du Génie (6 RG) - 6th Engineer Regiment (VAB Génie), in Angers
 Centre de Formation Initiale des Militaires du rang 9 Brigade d'Infanterie de Marine / 1er Régiment d'Artillerie de Marine (CFIM 9e BIMa - 1er RAMa) - 9th Marine Infantry Brigade Troops Initial Formation Centre / 1st Marine Artillery Regiment, in Coëtquidan
 Centre de Formation Initiale des Militaires du rang 9 Brigade d'Infanterie de Marine / 22e Régiment d'Infanterie de Marine (CFIM 9e BIMa - 22e RIMa) - 9th Marine Infantry Brigade Troops Initial Formation Centre / 22nd Marine Infantry Regiment, in Angoulême

 27 Brigade d’Infanterie de Montagne (27 BIM) – 27th Mountain Infantry Brigade, in Varces
 27 Compagnie de Commandement et de Transmissions de Montagne (27 CCTM) - 27th Mountain Command and Signals Company, in Varces
 4 Régiment de Chasseurs (4 RCh) - 4th Chasseurs Regiment (AMX-10 RC, ERC 90, VAB, VBL vehicles), in Gap
 7 Bataillon de Chasseurs Alpins (7 BCA) - 7th Mountain Infantry Battalion (VAB, VHM vehicles), in Varces
 13 Bataillon de Chasseurs Alpins (13 BCA) - 13th Mountain Infantry Battalion (VAB, VHM vehicles), in Saint-Alban-Leysse
 27 Bataillon de Chasseurs Alpins (27 BCA) - 27th Mountain Infantry Battalion (VAB, VHM vehicles), in Cran-Gevrier
 93 Régiment d'Artillerie de Montagne (93 RAM) - 93rd Mountain Artillery Regiment (CAESAR howitzers, RTF1 mortars, Mistral missiles), in Varces
 2 Régiment Étranger de Génie (2 REG) - 2nd Foreign Engineer Regiment, in Saint-Christol
 Centre de Formation Initiale des Militaires du rang 27 Brigade d’Infanterie de Montagne / 6e Bataillon de Chasseurs Alpins (CFIM 27 BIM - 6e BCA) - 27th Mountain Infantry Brigade Troops Initial Training Centre / 6th Mountain Infantry Battalion, in Gap
 École militaire de haute montagne (EMHM) - High Mountain Military School, in Chamonix
 Groupement d'Aguerrissement en Montagne (GAM) - Mountain Acclimatization Grouping, in Modane

Only the French units of the Franco-German Brigade are listed below.

 Brigade Franco-Allemande (BFA) – Franco-German Brigade, in Müllheim (Germany)
 1 Régiment d'Infanterie (1 RI) - 1st Infantry Regiment (VAB), in Sarrebourg (France)
 3 Régiment de Hussards (3 RH) - 3rd Hussar Regiment (AMX-10 RC, VAB, VBL vehicles), in Metz (France)
 Bataillon de Commandement et de Soutien (BCS) - Command and Support Battalion, in Müllheim (Germany)

References

Sources and bibliography 
 De Lattre de Tassigny, Histoire de la première armée française, Plon, 1949.
 Collectif, La première division blindée au combat, Malakoff, sur les Presses de Théo Brugière, le 30 juillet 1947
 Revue Ligne de front, Hors série numéro 5 de septembre octobre 2008.

Armored Division, 1st
Armored divisions of France
Military units and formations established in 1943
Military units and formations disestablished in 1946
Military units and formations established in 1948
Military units and formations disestablished in 1999
Military units and formations established in 2016